Wampocap
warfarin (INN)
Wartec
Wehdryl
Welchol (Daiichi Sankyo)
Wellbutrin (GlaxoSmithKline)
Wellcovorin (Amgen)
Wesmycin
Westadone (Sandoz)
Westcort
Westhroid (RLC Labs)
Wigraine
Wigrettes (Organon International)
Winpred
Winstrol (Zambon)
Wolfina
Wurinitur
Wyamine Sulfate
Wyamycin
Wycillin
Wydase
Wygesic
Wymox
Wytensin (Wyeth)